Sverre Løken (born 27 July 1960) is a Norwegian competition rower and Olympic medalist.

He received a bronze medal in coxless pairs at the 1984 Summer Olympics in Los Angeles, together with Hans Magnus Grepperud. He also won the coxless pair World Championship gold at the 1982 event in Luzerne, Switzerland.

After his athletic career, he trained as a physician, specializing in both general and orthopedic surgery. He is currently practicing sports medicine and is regarded as one of Norway's premier specialists on sports injuries. He works and researches at the Center of Sports Injury Research at the Oslo University Hospital (formerly Ullevål). Løken defended his PhD thesis on the subject of knee cartilage injuries in 2010.

References

1960 births
Living people
Norwegian male rowers
Olympic rowers of Norway
Olympic bronze medalists for Norway
Rowers at the 1984 Summer Olympics
Olympic medalists in rowing
World Rowing Championships medalists for Norway
Medalists at the 1984 Summer Olympics